Karl-Alfred Jacobsson (15 January 1926 – 4 March 2015) was a Swedish footballer who is best known for the time he spent at GAIS in Allsvenskan.

Career
At age 16 Jacobsson signed for second tier team Gårda BK who offered to buy him a trench coat to lure the young player to the club. After his season at Gårda he made an early Allsvenskan debut with GAIS the following year but then chose to play for Redbergslids IK while doing his military service.

In 1949 he returned to GAIS where he was the club's top goalscorer in eight of the ten seasons he spent there. When GAIS celebrated its 100-year anniversary in 1994 he was voted "Player of the Century" and at the end of 1999 he was also voted "Player of the Millennium" by the GAIS supporters. He died in 2015 at a nursing home in Gothenburg.

International career
Jacobsson scored three goals in six games for the Sweden national football team. He was also selected in the preliminary squads for the 1950 and 1958 FIFA World Cup but was cut from the final squads both times. During that time period players were selected to the national team by a committee instead of the manager and people in Gothenburg felt that the Stockholm-based committee were biased in only selecting players from the area around the Swedish capital.

Personal life
Jacobsson was born in the United States to a Swedish father and Italian mother. He spent five years in the country before his family relocated to Sweden. Jacobsson played professional football alongside his brother, Frank Jacobsson, with GAIS and the Sweden national football team. His nephew, Roberto Jacobsson, was also associated with GAIS as a manager and player.

Honours

Club 
Allsvenskan (1): 1953–54 Allsvenskan

Individual 
 Allsvenskan top goalscorer (3): 1951–52, 1952–53, 1953–54

References

External links
 Svensk Fotboll Profile
 NFT Profile

1926 births
2015 deaths
Soccer players from Boston
Swedish footballers
Sweden international footballers
Association football forwards
GAIS players
Allsvenskan players
American soccer players
Swedish people of Italian descent
American people of Swedish descent
American people of Italian descent